Leo Patrick Burke (born May 6, 1934 in Hagerstown, Maryland) is a retired American utility player in Major League Baseball. The graduate of Virginia Tech played two full seasons and parts of five others in MLB as a rightfielder, second baseman and third baseman for the Baltimore Orioles, Los Angeles Angels, St. Louis Cardinals and Chicago Cubs (1958–59; 1961–65).

Burke was involved in a waiver deal between the Cardinals and Cubs on June 24, 1963, when he was sent to Chicago for relief pitcher Barney Schultz, who would play a major role in the Cardinals' 1964 pennant-winning season.  Burke played 98 of his 165 MLB games in a Cub uniform.

During his Major League career, Burke batted .239 with 72 hits, nine home runs and 45 runs batted in.

References

Sources

1934 births
Living people
Baltimore Orioles players
Baseball players from Maryland
Chicago Cubs players
Dallas Rangers players
Knoxville Smokies players
Los Angeles Angels players
Major League Baseball right fielders
Miami Marlins (IL) players
St. Louis Cardinals players
Salt Lake City Bees players
San Antonio Missions players
Sportspeople from Hagerstown, Maryland
Virginia Tech Hokies baseball players
Virginia Tech Hokies football players